is a 2011 anime television series produced by Bones which aired on Fuji TV's noitamina program block between October 13, 2011 and December 22, 2011. Based on the noted Japanese intellectual and novelist Ango Sakaguchi's novel , the series is directed by Seiji Mizushima and written by Shō Aikawa, who had earlier worked together on Fullmetal Alchemist. Featuring character designs from Pako and Yun Kōga, the music for the series is composed by NARASAKI, with the opening theme being "How to Go" by School Food Punishment and the ending theme being "Fantasy" by LAMA.

Un-Go was simulcast with English subtitles by Crunchyroll and Anime on Demand. A prequel film, ran in Japanese theatres for two weeks from November 19, 2011. Sentai Filmworks has licensed the series, along with episode 0, in North America, while Siren Visual has licensed the series in Australia and Kazé has licensed the series in the United Kingdom.

Plot
Un-Go is set in a dystopian future Japan. After an unnamed war and multiple terrorist attacks finally reach the mainland, the Japanese government decides to revoke Article 9 of the Japanese Constitution and mobilizes their self-defense forces in retaliation. Some time later, the war-torn country eventually achieves a period of uneasy peace, and the Japanese government passes the "Information Privacy and Protection Act" in the name of stopping terrorism and further attacks against the country. The Act gives tech company executive Rinroku Kaishou control over a vast surveillance network that can acquire data through nearly any connected device in the country, which he supposedly uses to fight all sorts of crime.

The story of Un-Go revolves around an old-fashioned detective named Shinjūrō Yuki and his supernatural partner Inga. On the surface, Shinjūrō shows up to a crime scene at the wrong time and reaches the wrong conclusion, earning public mockery as "The Defeated Detective," in contrast to the heroic Rinroku. However, in truth, Shinjūrō is often called in by Rinroku or the Public Prosecutors Office when the subject of the case is too delicate for normal investigative procedure. With his deductive skills and Inga's special ability, Shinjūrō always digs deep to find the truth of the matter, even as Rinroku will spin his conclusion to fit a narrative that will comfort a public still recovering from the war.

Characters

A detective, often nicknamed "The Defeated Detective", and Inga's contractor. He has keen insight on mysteries - in particular, cases of murder. Prior to the start of the series, Shinjuurou was near death when his blood revived Inga, who in turn revived him from the brink of death. After the following incident, he made a deal with Inga: as long as Inga does not kill any more people, Shinjuurou will give her souls to eat. His personality is based on the works of Ango Sakaguchi. In the prequel movie, Kaishou Rinroku gives him his current identity, given that his original identity was lost during the chaos in Tokyo.

An Akuma, and Shinjuurou's partner and "boss". While usually seen in the form of a young boy, Inga occasionally transforms into a mature woman in order to devour souls. According to Shinjuuro, she can ask a person any single question, and the person "will have no choice but to answer with the truth". She does this instead of killing her victims, as a result of a deal she made with Shinjuurou in exchange for souls. Inga inhabits the body of Yuuko, a woman from Shinjuurou's past who killed herself to make sure no one could see into her soul, saving him in the process.

The director of the company J.J. Systems, Rinroku also acts as an adviser to Koyama in solving cases. He often monitors crime scenes from the comfort of his home, through an expert computer set-up.

Rinroku's daughter, who is often quite stubborn. She shows an interest in Shinjuurou and Inga after they solve a murder case at a private party. She dislikes the fact that her father, Rinroku, tends to cover up conspiracies instead of giving the public the truth.

A public prosecutor with a no-nonsense personality, Koyama often calls on Rinroku for help in solving cases. She does not think fondly of Shinjuurou, and even less of Inga.

A Real Artificial Intelligence program (R.A.I.) that can exist in various compatible systems. After being involved in a murder case, she is taken in by Shinjuurou and Inga. She often inhabits one of two bodies: the main robot body in the shape of a human girl, or a small stuffed panda toy.

Director of the Security Bureau, and part of the Metropolitan Police Department.

Episodes

References

External links
 
  
 

2011 anime OVAs
2011 anime television series debuts
Anime films based on novels
Bones (studio)
Fiction about deicide
Demons in television
Dolls in fiction
Fiction about mind control
Films directed by Seiji Mizushima
Films with screenplays by Shō Aikawa
Martyrdom in fiction
Mystery anime and manga
Noitamina
Postmodern works
Science fiction anime and manga
Sentai Filmworks
Supernatural anime and manga
Television episodes about artificial intelligence
Television shows based on Japanese novels
Terrorism in fiction
Theft in fiction
War in anime and manga
Yun Kōga
Occult detective anime and manga